Mehrak Golestan (born 29 December 1983) is a British rapper of Iranian descent.

He appeared on the BBC current affairs programme Newsnight on 9 August 2011 discussing the London riots of 2011.

He is the son of Iranian photographers Kaveh Golestan and Hengameh Golestan, and the grandson of writer and film director Ebrahim Golestan.

Discography

Extended plays 
Seven Shades (2012)

Mixtapes 
Poisonous Poetry (2005) (with Poisonous Poets)
Lost Tapes Vol. 1 (Poison and Other Toxins) (2011)
Lost Tapes Vol. 2 (Estates and Legacies) (2011)

Singles 
"Kill 'em With a Pen" (feat 7Khat) (2008)
"021LDN" (2011)
"I Predict a Riot" (2011)

As featured artist 
"Tiripe Ma" (with Hichkas) (2003)
"Dideh Va Del" (with Hichkas, Amin Fooladi, Bidad) (2006)
"Vatan Parast" (with Hichkas) (2006)
"Zendan" (with Hichkas) (2006)
"Khatteh Man (Remix)" (with Erfan, Khashayar, Afra, Mehrad Hidden) (2008)
"Long Live Palestine Part 2" (with Lowkey feat Dam, Narcy, Eslam Jawaad, Hichkas, Hasan Salaam, Shadia Mansour) (2010)
"Nefrat" (with Erfan) (2010)
"Marjan" (with Quf) (2011)
"Tiripe Ma 2" (with Hichkas) (2012)
"Ki Mige" (with Hichkas) (2020)

Music videos 
"Tiripe Ma" (2003)
"What Estate R U From" (2007)
"West London" (2011)
"Neva Blink" (2011)
"The Warning" (2012)
"7ntro" (2012)

References

External links
 RevealPoison.com
 Reveal's 7 Shades Album Review

British male rappers
Iranian rappers
Iranian hip hop musicians
British people of Iranian descent
Rappers from London
Living people
1983 births
Musicians of Iranian descent